This is a list of newspapers in Colorado.  According to the Library of Congress, over 2,500 newspapers have been published in Colorado.  The first documented newspaper was the Rocky Mountain Gold Reporter and Mountain City Herald, which was published by T. Gibson in 1859 in Mountain City, Colorado.   

Daily and weekly newspapers (currently published in Colorado)
Larger newspapers (listed by total average paid daily circulation as of 30 September 2012 as compiled by the Audit Bureau of Circulations):<includeonly>
This is a list of daily newspapers currently published in Colorado. For weekly newspapers, see List of newspapers in Colorado. And this is only as of 2012</includeonly>
 The Denver Post (412,669) — Denver
 The Gazette (64,394) — Colorado Springs
 Daily Camera (40,483) — Boulder
 The Pueblo Chieftain (35,793) — Pueblo
 The Daily Sentinel (23,602) — Grand Junction
 Daily Times-Call (20,820) — Longmont
 The Coloradoan (19,530) — Fort Collins
 Reporter-Herald (19,024) — Loveland
 The Durango Herald (7,710) — Durango
 Cañon City Daily Record'' (5,271) — Cañon City
Smaller newspapers
 Ag Journal Online — La Junta
 Akron News-Reporter — Akron (weekly)
 Aspen Daily News — Aspen
 The Aspen Times - Aspen 
 Aurora Sentinel — Aurora
 Bent County Democrat — Las Animas
 Berthoud Weekly Surveyor — Berthoud
 BizWest — Boulder
 Boulder Weekly — Boulder (weekly)
 Brighton Standard Blade — Brighton
 Broomfield Enterprise — Broomfield (semi-weekly)
 Brush News-Tribune — Brush (weekly)
 Burlington Record — Burlington (weekly)
 Canyon Courier — Conifer (weekly)
 Center Post Dispatch — Center 
 The Castle Pines Connection — Castle Pines (monthly)
 The Chaffee County Times — Buena Vista
 The Chronicle-News — Trinidad
 Colorado Daily — Boulder
 Colorado Hometown Weekly — east Boulder County (free weekly)
 The Colorado Springs Business Journal — Colorado Springs
 Colorado Springs Independent — Colorado Springs (weekly)
 Colorado Sun — Colorado (on-line)
 Commerce City Sentinel Express — Commerce City
 The Conejos County Citizen — Conejos County
 The Craig Press — Craig
 The Crested Butte News — Crested Butte
 The Crystal Valley Echo — Marble, Colorado
 Delta County Independent — Delta
 Denver Business Journal — Denver
 The Denver North Star — Denver
 Douglas County Business Magazine — Parker
 Douglas County News-Press — Castle Rock
 Dove Creek Press — Dove Creek, Dolores County
 The Durango Telegraph — Durango
 Eagle Valley Enterprise — Eagle
 Estes Park Trail-Gazette — Estes Park (weekly)
 The Flume: The Park County Republican & Fairplay Flume — Bailey and Fairplay
 Fort Lupton Press — Fort Lupton
 Fort Morgan Times — Fort Morgan
 The Fowler Tribune — Fowler
 Glendale Cherry Creek Chronicle — Denver, Glendale
 Gorizont — Denver (Russian)
 The Greeley Tribune — Greeley
 Gunnison Country Times — Gunnison
 Haxtun-Fleming Herald — Haxtun
 The Herald Democrat — Leadville
 High Country News — Paonia (semi-monthly)
 Intermountain Jewish News — Denver (weekly)
 The Johnstown Breeze — Johnstown
 The Journal — Cortez, Dolores, and Mancos
 Journal-Advocate — Sterling
 Julesburg Advocate — Julesburg (weekly)
 Kiowa County Press — Eads
 La Junta Tribune Democrat — La Junta
 La Prensa de Colorado — Denver (Spanish)
 La Voz Bilingüe — Denver (Bilingual weekly)
 Lamar Ledger — Lamar (weekly)
 Law Week Colorado — Denver (weekly)
 Life on Capitol Hill — Capitol Hill
 The Lyons Recorder — Lyons
 The Metropolitan — Metropolitan State University of Denver
 The Mirror — University of Northern Colorado 
 Monte Vista Journal — Monte Vista
 Montrose Mirror Online Newsblast — Montrose
 Montrose Press — Montrose
 The Mountain Ear — Nederland
 The Mountain Jackpot — Woodland Park (weekly)
 The Mountain Mail — Salida
 North Denver Tribune — Denver
 North Forty News — Wellington
 The North Weld Herald — Eaton
 Ouray County Plaindealer — Ouray (weekly)
 Our Community News - El Paso County (monthly)
 Out Front Colorado — Denver (bi-weekly)
 The Pagosa Springs Sun — Pagosa Springs
 The Pikes Peak Courier — Teller County
 Pine River Times — Bayfield
 Post Independent Citizen Telegram — Glenwood Springs and Rifle
 Redstone Review - Lyons, Colorado (Monthly)     
 Rio Blanco Herald Times — Meeker Rangely
 The Rocky Mountain Collegian — Fort Collins
 Saguache Crescent — Saguache
 Sangre de Cristo Sentinel — Westcliffe (weekly)
 Silverton Standard & The Miner — Silverton
 Sky-Hi News — Granby 
 Snowmass Sun — Snowmass 
 Steamboat Pilot & Today — Steamboat Springs
 Summit Daily News — Frisco
 Telluride Daily Planet — Telluride
 The Sopris Sun — Carbondale
 The Telluride Watch — Telluride
 The Tribune — Monument, Woodmore, and Gleneagle
 Vail Daily — Vail 
 Valley Courier — Alamosa
 The Villager — Greenwood Village
 Washington Park Profile — Denver (monthly)
 The Westside Pioneer — Colorado Springs
 Westword — Denver (weekly)
 Wet Mountain Tribune — Westcliffe
 Windsor Now — Windsor
 World Journal — Walsenburg
 Yellow Scene Magazine — Erie

Defunct newspapers
 The Advocate — Denver
 Animas Forks Pioneer — Animas Forks  (18821886)
 The Aspen Wall Poster — Denver
 Boulder County Business Report — Boulder
 Boulder Planet (weekly; July 10, 1996 - February 16, 2000) - Boulder
 Brighton Banner — Brighton
 The Campus Press — University of Colorado at Boulder
 Cañon Cafe — Cañon City
 Colorado Springs Sun
 The Colorado Statesman — Denver
 La Cucaracha (newspaper) — Pueblo
 Denver Daily News
 Denver Democrat — Denver
 The Denver Times (1872-1926)
 El Paso County Advertiser and Fountain Valley News — Fountain
Erie Echo (weekly; Dec. 1977-1980)
 Fort Collins Now
 Grand Junction Free Press — Grand Junction
Lafayette News — Lafayette
Leadville Chronicle — Leadville
 Local Yeti — Denver (daily)
Louisville Times — Louisville
 The Meadowlark Herald — Elizabeth
 Mile High News — Golden
 Moffat County News — Craig
 Mountain Valley News — Cedaredge
 Northern Colorado Business Report — Fort Collins
 The Pagosa Free Press — Pagosa Springs
Press - Pueblo (democratic evening paper, end of 19th century)
 The Rico Bugle — Rico
 Rocky Mountain News — Denver
 Rolling Stock — Boulder
Superior Observer — Superior
 The Trinidad Times Independent — Trinidad
 The UNC Connection — Greeley
 The Vail Trail — Vail

See also

List of African-American newspapers in Colorado

References

External links
 . (Survey of local news existence and ownership in 21st century)
 Colorado Historic Newspapers Collection (CHNC) "a service of the Colorado State Library... includes more than 2,000,000 digitized pages from more than 500 individual newspaper titles published in Colorado primarily from 1859 to 1923" and, with publisher's permission, some newer digitized content

 Defunct newspapers
 Newspapers published in Colorado